Pachypeza borealis is a species of beetle in the family Cerambycidae. It was described by Hovore and Giesbert in 1998.

References

Agapanthiini
Beetles described in 1998